Gerard Frederikszoon de With was the second Dutch governor of Formosa, from 1625 to 1627, succeeding Martinus Sonck.

References

Bibliography

 

Year of birth missing
Year of death missing
Colonial governors of Dutch Formosa